Melissodes communis, the common long-horned bee, is a species of long-horned bee in the family Apidae. It is found in Central America and North America.

Subspecies
These two subspecies belong to the species Melissodes communis:
 Melissodes communis alopex Cockerell, 1928
 Melissodes communis communis Cresson, 1878

References

Further reading

External links

 

Apinae
Articles created by Qbugbot
Insects described in 1878